Tim Somerville (born September 14, 1960) is an American curler from Coon Rapids, Minnesota. He is a three-time Olympian, including winning the bronze medal at the 1992 Winter Games when curling was an exhibition event.

Curling career 
As a junior curler, Somerville was a four-time Wisconsin state junior champion, 1979–82. After this run of junior championships, he joined his father Bud's men's team and won the Wisconsin state men's championship in back-to-back years, 1983 and 1984. Still playing with his father, he won the bronze medal at the 1992 Winter Olympics in Albertville, France, where curling was still an exhibition event.

After the 1992 Winter Games, Somerville returned to skipping his own team, to great success. He won the United States Men's Championship three times, in 1995, 1996, and 1999. Each of those years he then represented the United States at the World Men's Championships, where he finished fourth, seventh, and fourth, respectively. He also competed at the 1998 Winter Olympics in Nagano, where the American team placed fourth, and at the 2002 Winter Olympics in Salt Lake City.

Personal life 
Somerville's father, Bud Somerville, was also a highly successful curler. Bud was world champion in 1965 and 1974, was skip of the 1992 bronze medal Olympic team, and the first inductee into the United States Curling Hall of Fame.

Teams

References

External links

1960 births
Living people
Sportspeople from Superior, Wisconsin
American male curlers
Olympic curlers of the United States
Curlers at the 1992 Winter Olympics
Curlers at the 1998 Winter Olympics
Curlers at the 2002 Winter Olympics
American curling champions